Jonathan Erlich and Artem Sitak were the defending champions, but Sitak chose not to participate this year. Erlich partnered up with Andrei Vasilevski, but they lost to Jérémy Chardy and Fabrice Martin in the first round.

Nikola Mektić and Mate Pavić won the title, defeating Ivan Dodig and Filip Polášek in the final, 6–2, 6–4.

Seeds

Draw

Draw

References
 Main Draw

2021 ATP Tour
2021 Antalya Open – Doubles